Wayne Robert Godwin (born 13 March 1982) is an English former professional rugby league footballer who played as a  in the 2000s and 2010s.

Godwin played for the Castleford Tigers (Heritage № 779), the Wigan Warriors (Heritage № 971), Hull FC, the Bradford Bulls and the Salford Red Devils in the Super League, and for Dewsbury Rams in the Championship.

Background
Godwin was born in Pontefract, West Yorkshire, England. He supported the Castleford Tigers as a child.

Early career
Godwin turned pro in 2002, being signed from his local club Knottingley Rockware to play for Castleford until the end of 2004, making over 60 appearances. Godwin signed a two-year deal with Wigan after Castleford's relegation at the end of 2004's Super League IX.

Goodwin was called into the England A squad for the 2004 European Challenge Cup.

Godwin signed for Hull F.C. in 2006.

Bradford
Godwin signed for Bradford in 2008 and was the understudy to Terry Newton, during his time at Bradford he always wore the number 14 shirt and established himself as a fans' favourite. 
During his time at Bradford he played many different positions including loose forward several times.

Mick Potter's arrival at Odsal and the arrival of the vastly experienced hooker Matt Diskin put Godwin in a position where he would be the 3rd choice hooker and would not feature in every game of the 2011 season.

Salford
It was announced that Godwin had joined Salford due to their intended hooker, Tevita Leo Latu being refused a visa. On Godwin's début, he scored a try but Salford still lost 13–12 to Leigh.

Dewsbury
Goodwin signed for Dewsbury for the 2014 season, playing in the Kingstone Press Championship. On 15 March 2015, Godwin returned on a four-week loan to Salford.

Statistics

Club career

International career

Outside rugby league
In 2013, Godwin launched a clothing brand with former team mates Jamie Langley and Duane Straugheir named 'We Are Taurus'.

References

External links
(archived by web.archive.org) Bradford Bulls profile
(archived by web.archive.org) Castleford Tigers profile
(archived by web.archive.org) Godwin Signs For Hull FC form www.wiganwarriors.com 
Hooker Godwin agrees Hull switch from BBC Sport
GODWIN TO JOIN BULLS
The Bulls tied up the services of Wayne Godwin
Wayne Godwin Statistics at wigan.rlfans.com

1982 births
Living people
Bradford Bulls players
Castleford Tigers players
Dewsbury Rams players
England national rugby league team players
English rugby league players
Hull F.C. players
Rugby league hookers
Rugby league players from Pontefract
Salford Red Devils players
Sportspeople from Knottingley
Wigan Warriors players